Máximo Ramírez (born 9 June 1933) is a Bolivian footballer. He played in five matches for the Bolivia national football team in 1963. He was also part of Bolivia's squad that won the 1963 South American Championship.

References

1933 births
Living people
Bolivian footballers
Bolivia international footballers
Place of birth missing (living people)
Association football defenders
The Strongest players